Srebrinovo is a village in the Panagyurishte municipality of western Bulgaria.  The village has 25 inhabitants.

Villages in Pazardzhik Province